The discography of the Japanese singer-songwriter Hiroko Moriguchi consists of ten studio albums, eight compilation albums, and thirty four singles released since 1985.

Albums

Studio albums

Extended plays

Cover albums

Compilations

Singles

Regular singles

Collaboration singles

Videography

Music video albums

Live video albums

Exclusive releases

Other video releases

Footnotes

References

External links 
 

Discographies of Japanese artists
Pop music discographies